Ferenc Keresztes-Fischer (18 February 1881 – 3 March 1948) was a Hungarian lawyer and politician. He was an advisor of the Pécsi Takarékpénztár Rt. / Pécs Savings Bank Corp. He was the prefect of Baranya County 1921–1931, and the prefect of Somogy County 1925–1931 and was appointed as Interior Minister of Hungary twice; between 1931–1935 and 1938–1944. He controlled the police terror against both the left and right wing political movements. In a secret directive he ordered the collection of Press articles.(?) On 12 September 1938, he allowed the OMIKE to increase its activities. During the Second World War he was an active supporter of the Regent, Admiral Miklós Horthy. After the death of Pál Teleki (3 April 1941) Keresztes-Fischer became acting Prime Minister on that day. One year later, On March 7, 1942, Bárdossy the prime minister was forced to resign suddenly by Regent Horthy and as Minister of the Interior, Ferenc-Keresztes was the interim Prime Minister until 9 March, when Miklós Kállay was appointed to this position.

He joined the Bethlen-Kállay political conservatives, which wanted to establish contacts with the Allies to negotiate Hungary's treatment after the war. After the March 1944 occupation of Hungary by Nazi Germany, he was imprisoned in a concentration camp and then exiled to Austria.

His younger brother was Lajos Keresztes-Fischer, a Hungarian military officer who served as Chief of General Staff in 1938. He was also arrested after Ferenc Szálasi's coup.

See also

 Serbian-Hungarian Baranya-Baja Republic 1921

References

Sources 
 Magyar Életrajzi Lexikon
 Bölöny, József – Hubai, László: Magyarország kormányai 1848–2004 [Cabinets of Hungary 1848–2004], Akadémiai Kiadó, Budapest, 2004 (5th edition).
 Akten des Volksgerichtsprozesses gegen Franz A. Basch, Volksgruppenführer der Deutschen in Ungarn, Budapest 1945/46, Friedrich Spiegel-Schmidt, Lóránt Tilkovszky, Gerhard Seewann, Norbert Spannenberger, Oldenbourg Wissenschaftsverlag 1999.

1881 births
1948 deaths
People from Pécs
Hungarian people of German descent
Prime Ministers of Hungary
Hungarian Interior Ministers
Foreign ministers of Hungary
Hungarian emigrants to Austria
20th-century Hungarian people